Kent Ford may refer to:

 Kent Ford (activist) (born 1943), activist who co-founded the Portland, Oregon chapter of the Black Panther Party
 Kent Ford (astronomer) (born 1931), astronomer involved with the theory of dark matter
 Kent Ford (canoeist) (born 1957), former American slalom canoeist